Olivier Sajous (born 4 February 1987) is a Haitian tennis player.

Sajous has a career high ATP singles ranking of 508 achieved on 9 May 2011. He also has a career high ATP doubles ranking of 996 achieved on 15 November 2010.

Sajous represented Haiti at the Davis Cup, where he had a W/L record of 22–16.

Future and Challenger finals

Singles: 1 (0–1)

Doubles 1 (0–1)

External links
 
 
 

1987 births
Living people
Haitian male tennis players
Sportspeople from Port-au-Prince
Tennis players at the 2011 Pan American Games
Pan American Games competitors for Haiti